Starsector (formerly Starfarer) is a top-down single-player indie role-playing game developed and published by Fractal Softworks for computers in 2011. Set in the year 3126, the player commands a fleet of spaceships and engages in combat, trade, and exploration in a procedurally generated world.

Reviewers praised the game on release and have continued to do so on every update, calling it a sort of "Mount & Blade: Warband in space". Fractal Softworks have continued to regularly update the game with new ships, weapons, and missions.

Gameplay
Starsector is an open world single-player space combat role playing and exploration game, with a procedurally generated map. The player is able to interact with and join one of 7 factions, remain as an independent, or become a mercenary. At the start of the game, the player is given the option to choose their headshot and spawns in the world with a small fleet of ships. After an extremely short series of tutorial missions, the player is given complete freedom to do whatever they desire. Movement of your fleet in the game is controlled by your mouse, or can be set on autopilot. You can either travel freely through space or select a destination to travel to various colonies where you can purchase materials. During the game, one can hire crew members, purchase ships, and conduct trade. As of the 0.9 patch, you are able to  establish your own colony and manage it yourself later in the game.

Missions are offered as you fly through space or go to colonies, and will disappear soon after, as transmissions travel in real time. Completing these missions rewards you with credits which you can use to repair ships, purchase fuel, buy new ships, or hire officers. The game sports a real-time simulated economy on every colony, with an open market (subject to a tariff of 30 percent) as well as a black market, where one can purchase goods without a tariff, as well as various illegal materials such as recreational drugs, human organs, and AI cores.

All ships in the game are extremely customizable, and the player can equip different weapons, perks, and special abilities to every ship.

Combat
Combat occurs when one fleet intercepts another in space. The game interface then changes and the player is able to take control of a ship directly. The player is also able to control all other ships with basic commands such as "avoid" or "full retreat". Different weapons do more damage against different types of targets (shields, hulls, etc.). The game uses standard WASD movement, with the option to strafe using your mouse. A ship generates flux when it fires or absorbs damage with their shields (if applicable), which has to be vented out into space through a process which leaves it momentarily defenseless, or face being rendered totally nonfunctional for a longer period.

Victory provides the player an opportunity to loot the ships or add some to their fleet. Failure means they may attempt a full retreat. If they fail at the retreat and their fleet is destroyed, the player will not die but will escape and be given a minuscule fleet in order to start over again. Combat rewards players with experience, which they can use on their character to gain more skills.

Plot
The game itself has minimal plot, and the player is involved in very few story moments. The player is instead intended to create their own story. Lead developer Alexander Mosolov has stated that the player is intended to uncover lore as they travel throughout the world.

The game takes place in the year 3126, after humanity developed faster-than-light travel using transport gates. For many years, this method of travel created a golden age for humanity. However, exactly 206 cycles ago, all transport gates abruptly ceased to function and humanity was plunged into a Dark Age where piracy went rampant and splintering factions began to form and exert their influence. This event is referred to as "the collapse". 206 cycles after the collapse, our player enters the sector. In the sector, there are various different factions that have taken hold and reached a strategic stalemate, with no faction being able to win. These factions are:

 The Hegemony, a martial state that believe that they are the true successor to the galaxy. In game, the hegemony are the largest faction with the most colonies. They mostly use low-tech ships with heavy armor and inefficient shields.
 The Persean League, a faction whose sole purpose is to revolt against what they believe to be the illegitimate martial law enforced by the Hegemony. They mostly use balanced "midline" ships and control many markets on various worlds.
 The Tri-Tachyon are the remnants of the Tri-Tachyon corporation, one of the most powerful corporations in the sector before the collapse. They make and sell most of the technology found in game, and use high-tech ships, fast and with powerful shields.
 The Sindrian Diktat, a faction founded after a revolt against the Hegemony. They are considered by the system at large to be a military dictatorship. They primarily manufacture fuel.
 The Luddic Church, also known as The Church of Galactic Redemption, is a faction inspired by a martyr named Ludd. They blame technology for the downfall of humanity and seek a return to a simpler time. They use simple, low-tech ships.
 The Luddic Path is an extreme sect of the Luddic church that claim to have a truer interpretation of Ludd's teachings. They believe that only through extreme violence will humanity return to a simpler age. The Luddic Path is hostile to every faction except the Luddic Church and pirates.
 Pirates are a loose faction of mercenaries, bandits, looters, and terrorists. Bounties are often put on pirates' heads, and collecting said bounties is one of the main ways to earn money. Pirates are hostile to every faction except the Luddic Path.

Development
The game was made entirely by Fractal Softworks, led by indie developer Alexander Mosolov. Mosolov cited Star Control II as a "major" influence on the game's development, as well as Wing Commander: Privateer, Sid Meier's Pirates!, and Solar Winds.

The Alpha Version of Starsector was released on April 29, 2011, with six missions and a tutorial, as well as some basic modding tools. Starsector is written in Java using LWJGL, and has been receiving steady updates for over a decade. As of January 3, 2021 the game contains 14 missions, 3 combat tutorials, the steadily-updating campaign mode with several major gameplay systems (an economy that easily scales-up, planetary colonization, exploration and salvage, factional reputations, bounty hunting, player and non-player colony raiding). These systems are well-integrated with the core combat gameplay and some are expected to be expanded or improved upon, such as expanding the player's options in raiding colonies.

The game is currently available for Windows, MacOS, and Linux. Notably, the game is not currently available on digital distribution platforms such as Steam. A release on those platforms is planned in the future, when the game is more "ready".

Reception
Since the Alpha version of the game, the game has received critical acclaim, most notably from Rock, Paper, Shotgun, who said in 2012 that the game was "already top-notch stuff". Eurogamer also previewed the game in 2013, saying that "even now there's a lot to relish", while expressing optimism about the game's expansion. That same year, Kotaku recommended it as a successor to Star Control II and The Ur-Quan Masters. Cubed3 previewed the unfinished game in 2017, explaining that Starsector "has a way to go as far as hammering out balance ... which is a massive annoyance to an otherwise promising space sandbox game." Rock Paper Shotgun noted that the game was still unfinished in 2018, but recommended the game as "more than worth the money already".

References

External links 
 Official website

Action-adventure games
Early access video games
Indie video games
Linux games
MacOS games
Open-world video games
Single-player video games
Upcoming video games
Video games set in outer space
Video games set in the future
Video games with user-generated gameplay content
Windows games